Torpoint West was an electoral division of Cornwall in the United Kingdom which returned one member to sit on Cornwall Council between 2009 and 2021. It was abolished at the 2021 local elections, being succeeded by Torpoint.

Councillors

Extent
Torpoint West covers the west of the town of Torpoint, including the grounds of Torpoint Community College and HMS Raleigh. The division was slightly affected by boundary changes at the 2013 election. From 2009 to 2013, the division covered 295 hectares in total; after redistricting, it covered 297 hectares.

Election results

2017 election

2013 election

2009 election

References

Electoral divisions of Cornwall Council